Bronson Pelletier (born December 31, 1986) is a Canadian actor. He is perhaps best known for his roles as Jack Sinclair in renegadepress.com (2004–2008) and as Jared Cameron in The Twilight Saga film series.

Life and career
Bronson Pelletier was born on December 31, 1986. He is of Plains Cree and French heritage. He had four brothers, one died as a young teen after he had been hit by a car in Surrey, British Columbia. He travelled to New Zealand and Denmark to promote The Twilight Saga: New Moon, where he took part in interviews and attended the Armageddon
He also participated in 'The Apartment' season 4.

In May 2017, Pelletier signed with New York City based Shakir Entertainment Management.

Filmography

References

External links
 

1986 births
Canadian male television actors
Cree people
First Nations male actors
Living people
Canadian male film actors
Canadian people of French descent